Wallal is the location of a bore in the Kimberley region of Western Australia.

The bore falls within the boundaries of Wallal Downs Station, a historical pastoral lease, that operates in the area. The station also has a caravan park situated in close proximity to the bore and Eighty Mile Beach. An airstrip suitable for light planes is also located nearby. 

The station is the most southerly cattle station in the Kimberley. Cattle reared in the area are mostly sent to market in Port Hedland or Broome and are occasionally sent to Darwin after being fattened up in the Northern Territory in lean seasons. The property is family owned and run along with Warrawagine Station. Wallal was stocked with 8,000 head of Brahman in 2015.

Wallal is also of historical interest as the location of an international effort to observe the solar eclipse on 21 September 1922, to validate Einstein's theory of relativity.

See also
List of ranches and stations

References 

Kimberley (Western Australia)
Pastoral leases in Western Australia